Mariano Galarza (born November 12, 1986 in 25 de Mayo, Buenos Aires) is an Argentine rugby union player. He plays lock for French Top 14 club Bayonne. His former clubs have included Universitarios de La Plata, in Argentina, Leinster and Worcester.
Galarza, a student of medicine, was selected to Los Pumas squad for the 2008 end of year tour to Europe. He debuted for the Argentine national team in 2010 and participated in the 2011 Rugby World Cup.

He signed a deal with Leinster at the start of the 2010–11 season and made his Celtic League debut against Glasgow Warriors in September 2010.  After just four caps he left Leinster in February 2011 to play for Argentine side Pampas XV in the Vodacom Cup.

In 2013, he signed with English team Worcester Warriors. On 5 February 2014, Galarza was signed by local rivals Gloucester Rugby, which would see him leave Warriors at the end of the 2013–14 season.

On 4 October 2018, Galarza left Gloucester with immediate effect to join French side Bordeaux in the Top 14 for 2018-19 season. Afterwards, Galarza signed for Top 14 rivals Bayonne from the 2019-20 season.

References

External links
 

1986 births
Living people
Argentine people of Basque descent
People from Veinticinco de Mayo Partido
Sportspeople from Buenos Aires Province
Argentine rugby union players
Argentina international rugby union players
Leinster Rugby players
Pampas XV players
Worcester Warriors players
Gloucester Rugby players
Argentine expatriate rugby union players
Argentine expatriate sportspeople in England
Argentine expatriate sportspeople in Ireland
Expatriate rugby union players in England
Expatriate rugby union players in Ireland
Rugby union locks